Cotalpa is a genus of beetle in the family Scarabaeidae. All six species within the genus are found in the Nearctic realm.

Species
Cotalpa ashleyae
Cotalpa conclamara
Cotalpa consobrina
Cotalpa flavida 
Cotalpa lanigera 
Cotalpa subcribrata

References

Rutelinae